Southern Pacific 5021 is an SP-2 class 4-10-2 steam locomotive built in 1926 by ALCO at their Schenectady, New York, shops. It is the only member of this class of SP locomotives to be preserved, and it is one of only five three-cylinder locomotives preserved in North America.

History
The locomotive was built in 1926 by the American Locomotive Company, it was designed to haul mixed freight and passenger trains over the Sierra Nevada range between northern California and Nevada. Later in its career, No. 5021 was shifted to service in Oregon, where it remained until its retirement in 1955.

Southern Pacific donated No. 5021 to the Railway and Locomotive Historical Society on March 8, 1956. In 1961, it was fired up and used for operation on the museum's spur line. However, the Southern Pacific did not like this, so they were forced to pull the tracks in 1963. Following this, No. 5021 was stored in the roundhouse of the Atchison, Topeka and Santa Fe Railway. While it was stored, a possible excursion career for the No. 5021 was being arranged by the Santa Fe, but the plans were dropped.

5021 sat in Southern Pacific's San Bernardino yard until 1975, when it was moved to the Southern Pacific Taylor Yard in Glendale, CA. Shortly after, it was moved back to the RailGiants Train Museum, when Southern Pacific 4449 was on display with the American Freedom Train in the Los Angeles County Fairgrounds. As of 2022, No. 5021 is on permanent display at the Fairplex railway exhibit in Pomona, California.

References

External links 
 Southern Pacific 5021

5021
ALCO locomotives
4-10-2 locomotives
Standard gauge locomotives of the United States
Railway locomotives introduced in 1926
Preserved steam locomotives of California